"Pod sjajem zvezda" (also known as "Pod sjajem zvezda ove noći") (Serbian for "Under the Starlight This Night") is a Serbian evergreen song composed in 1958, by Predrag Ivanović, with lyrics by Mirjana Savić and recorded by Serbian quartet Vokalni kvartet Predraga Ivanovića for the soundtrack of the 1960 Ljubav i moda film. Song is later released on the group album with the same name, in 1978. The song became popular in former Yugoslavia and performed by many artists.

External links 
 Song at Discogs.com
 Predrag Ivanović about the song in an interview for NIN

1958 songs